François-Didier Gregh (26 March 1906 – 21 October 1992) was a Minister of State for Monaco. He was in office from 1969 to 1972.

Awards and honors

Monegasque honors
 Grand Officer of the Order of Saint Charles

References

Ministers of State of Monaco
1906 births
1992 deaths